Lakshminarayanan Mahadevan FRS   is a scientist  of Indian origin, and is currently the Lola England de Valpine Professor of Applied Mathematics, Organismic and Evolutionary Biology and Physics at Harvard University.  His work centers around understanding the organization of matter in space and time (that is, how it is shaped and how it flows, particularly at the scale observable by the unaided senses, in both physical and biological systems). Mahadevan is a 2009 MacArthur Fellow.

Education
Mahadevan graduated from the Indian Institute of Technology, Madras, and then received an M.S. from the University of Texas at Austin, and an M.S. and Ph.D. from Stanford University in 1995.

Career and research
He started his independent career on the faculty at the Massachusetts Institute of Technology in 1996. In 2000, he was elected the inaugural Schlumberger Professor of Complex Physical Systems in the Department of Applied Mathematics and Theoretical Physics, and a professorial fellow of Trinity College, Cambridge, University of Cambridge, the first Indian to be appointed professor to the Faculty of Mathematics there.

He has been at Harvard since 2003, where he served as the chair/co-chair of Applied Mathematics from 2016–2021. Since 2017, together with A. Mahadevan, he has been the faculty dean of Mather House, one of twelve residential houses (with ~400 students) at Harvard College.

Awards
 2016 Fellow of the Royal Society
 2014 Clay Senior Scholar
 2009 MacArthur Fellow
 2006 Guggenheim Fellowship
 2007 Ig Nobel Prize for physics
 2007 Visiting Miller Professor, University of California, Berkeley
 2006 George Ledlie Prize, Harvard University

References

External links
 "Recent Publications", The Applied Math Lab
 "Google Scholar"

Living people
IIT Madras alumni
Stanford University alumni
University of Texas at Austin College of Natural Sciences alumni
Harvard University faculty
Massachusetts Institute of Technology School of Science faculty
MacArthur Fellows
Radcliffe fellows
Fellows of the Royal Society
Santa Fe Institute people
American academics of Indian descent
Year of birth missing (living people)